Generalized periodic epileptiform discharges (GPEDs) are very rare abnormal patterns found in EEG.

Types
Based on the interval between the discharges they are classified as:
 Periodic short-interval diffuse discharges (PSIDDs)
 Periodic long-interval diffuse discharges (PLIDDs)
 Burst suppression patterns

References

Electroencephalography
Neuroscience